Trafficante may refer to:

Trafficante crime family, mafia crime family in the state of Florida.
Santo Trafficante Sr. (1886–1954)  Sicilian-born mobster, and father of the powerful mobster Santo Trafficante Jr.
Santo Trafficante Jr. (1914–1987)  Powerful Tampa, Florida-born mobster, son of mobster Santo Trafficante Sr.

See also
 James Traficant (19412014), U.S. Representative from Ohio